The English Football League (EFL) is a league of professional football clubs from England and Wales. Founded in 1888 as the Football League, the league is the oldest such competition in the world. It was the top-level football league in England from its foundation until 1992, when the top 22 clubs split from it to form the Premier League.

The EFL is divided into the Championship, League One and League Two, with 24 clubs in each division, 72 in total, with promotion and relegation between them; the top Championship division clubs change places with the lowest-placed clubs in the Premier League, and the bottom clubs of League Two with the top clubs of the National League. Currently three of the EFL clubs are from Wales – Cardiff City, Swansea City and Newport County – the rest of the 72 are located in England.

The Football League had a sponsor from the 1983–84 season, and thus was known by various names. For the 2016–17 season, the league rebranded itself as the English Football League (EFL).

The English Football League also organises two knock-out cup competitions, the EFL Cup and the EFL Trophy. The operations centre of the Football League is in Preston, while its commercial office is in London.

Overview
The Football League consists of 69 professional association football clubs in England and three in Wales. It runs the oldest professional football league competition in the world. It also organises two knockout cup competitions, the EFL Cup and EFL Trophy. The Football League was founded in 1888 by Aston Villa director William McGregor, originally with twelve member clubs. Steady growth and the addition of more divisions meant that by 1950 the League had 92 clubs. Financial considerations led to a major shake-up in 1992, when in a step to maximise their revenue the leading members of the Football League broke away to form their own competition, the FA Premier League, which was renamed the Premier League in 2007. The Football League therefore no longer includes the top twenty clubs who belong to this group, although promotion and relegation between the Football League and the Premier League continues. In total, 136 teams have played in the Football League up to 2013 (including those in the Premier League, since clubs must pass through the Football League before reaching the former).

Competition

League
The EFL's 72 member clubs are grouped into three divisions: the EFL Championship, EFL League One, and EFL League Two (previously the Football League First Division, Football League Second Division and Football League Third Division respectively; they were renamed for sponsorship reasons). Each division has 24 clubs, and in any given season a club plays each of the others in the same division twice, once at their home stadium and once at that of their opponent's. This makes for a total of 46 games played each season.

Clubs gain three points for a win, one for a draw, and none for a defeat. At the end of the season, clubs at the top of their division may win promotion to the next higher division, while those at the bottom may be relegated to the next lower one. At the top end of the competition, three Championship clubs win promotion from the Football League to the Premier League, with the bottom three Premier League clubs taking their places. At the lower end, two League Two clubs lose their Football League status with relegation to the National division of the National League, while two teams from that division join League Two of The Football League in their stead.

Promotion and relegation are determined by final league positions, but to sustain interest for more clubs over the length of the season, one promotion place from each division is decided according to a playoff between four clubs, which takes place at the end of the season. It is possible for a team finishing sixth in the Championship or League One, or seventh in League Two, to be promoted rather than the clubs finishing immediately above them in the standings.

Since the 2004–05 season, penalties have existed for clubs entering financial administration during the season. If a club enters administration before 31 March of any given season, they will immediately be deducted twelve points; entering administration from 1 April onward will see the points deduction either held over until the end of the season (if the club finishes outside the relegation places) or applied the following season (if the club was relegated anyway). Also, it is required that a club exiting administration agrees to a Creditor's Voluntary Agreement and pays in full any other footballing creditors. Failure to do either of these will result in a second, potentially unlimited (though in practice usually between fifteen and twenty) points deduction.

The other main situation in which is a club may lose points is by fielding an improperly registered or otherwise ineligible player. If a club is found to have done this, then any points earned from any match that player participated in will be deducted; the opposing club(s) do not earn any points from this, however.

Cup
The EFL organises two knock-out cup competitions: the EFL Cup (officially known as the Carabao Cup for sponsorship reasons) and the EFL Trophy (officially known as the Papa John's Trophy also for sponsorship reasons). The EFL Cup was established in 1960 and is open to all EFL and Premier League clubs, with the winner eligible to participate in the UEFA Europa Conference League. The EFL Trophy, established in 1983, is for clubs belonging to EFL League One and EFL League Two. The organisation celebrated its 100th anniversary in 1988 with a Centenary Tournament at Wembley between sixteen of its member clubs.

History

After four years of debate, the Football Association finally permitted professionalism on 20 July 1885. Before that date many clubs made payments to "professional" players to boost the competitiveness of their teams, breaking FA rules and arousing the contempt of those clubs abiding by the laws of the amateur Football Association code. As more and more clubs became professional the ad-hoc fixture list of FA Cup, inter-county, and ordinary matches was seen by many as an unreliable stream of revenue, and ways were considered of ensuring a consistent income.

A Scottish director of Birmingham-based Aston Villa, William McGregor, was the first to set out to bring some order to a chaotic world where clubs arranged their own fixtures, along with various cup competitions. On 22 March 1888, he wrote to the committee of his own club, Aston Villa, as well as to those of Blackburn Rovers, Bolton Wanderers, Preston North End, Stoke and West Bromwich Albion; suggesting the creation of a league competition that would provide a number of guaranteed fixtures for its member clubs each season. His idea might have been based upon a description of a proposal for an early American college football league, publicised in the English media in 1887 which stated: "measures would be taken to form a new football league ... [consisting of] a schedule containing two championship games between every two colleges composing the league".

The first meeting was held at Anderton's Hotel in London on 23 March 1888 on the eve of the FA Cup Final. The Football League was formally created and named in Manchester at a further meeting on 17 April at the Royal Hotel. The name "Association Football Union" was proposed by McGregor but this was felt too close to "Rugby Football Union". Instead, "The Football League" was proposed by Major William Sudell, representing Preston, and quickly agreed upon. Although the Royal Hotel is long gone, the site is marked with a commemorative red plaque on the Royal Buildings in Market Street. The first season of the Football League began a few months later on 8 September with twelve member clubs from the Midlands and north of England: Accrington, Aston Villa, Blackburn Rovers, Bolton Wanderers, Burnley, Derby County, Everton, Notts County, Preston North End, Stoke (renamed Stoke City in 1926), West Bromwich Albion and Wolverhampton Wanderers.

Each club played the others twice, once at home and once away, and two points were awarded for a win and one for a draw. This points system was not agreed upon until after the season had started; the alternative proposal was one point for a win only. Preston won the first league title without losing a game and completed the first league–cup double by also taking the FA Cup. Teams finishing at the bottom of the table were required to reapply for their position in the league for the following year in a process called "re-election".

In 1890, Stoke was not re-elected to the league and was replaced for the 1890–91 season by Sunderland, who won it in their second, third, and fifth year. Stoke was re-elected for the 1891–92 season, along with Darwen, to take the league to fourteen clubs.

Preston North End, Aston Villa, and Sunderland dominated the early years of the game. In the first ten seasons, the only other clubs to win (single) league titles were Everton and Sheffield United.

Addition of the Second Division

A new Second Division was formed in 1892 with the absorption of the rival 12-club Football Alliance. Alliance clubs Nottingham Forest, The Wednesday (later renamed Sheffield Wednesday) and Newton Heath (later renamed Manchester United) were added to the new First Division, and Crewe Alexandra and Darwen were reallocated to the new Second, bringing the First Division total to sixteen clubs. With the addition of Northwich Victoria (from The Combination), Burslem Port Vale (later renamed Port Vale, from the Midland League) and Sheffield United (from the Northern League), the Second Division started with twelve clubs, as Alliance club Birmingham St George's disbanded at that point. The bottom clubs of the lower division were subsequently required to apply for re-election to the League at the end of each season.

Accrington was relegated from the First Division but chose to resign from the Football League rather than play in the Second Division. Bootle were dissolved because of financial problems. The Second Division increased to fifteen clubs for season 1893–94. Instead of three clubs expanding the division, five were added to make the number fifteen. The additional clubs were Liverpool from the Lancashire League, Middlesbrough Ironopolis and Newcastle United from the Northern League, Rotherham Town from the Midland League, and Woolwich Arsenal (later Arsenal), who became the first team from the South of England to compete.

For the following season 1894–95, the third season of the division, there was a net increase to sixteen with the addition of Bury from the Lancashire League, Leicester Fosse (later Leicester City) and Burton Wanderers (who later joined with existing Second Division club Burton Swifts to form Burton United) from the Midland League along with Lincoln City, while Northwich resigned and Middlesbrough Ironopolis disbanded.

Both Liverpool and Bury won the division at the first attempt.

In 1895 Loughborough replaced Walsall Town Swifts. In 1896 Blackpool from the Lancashire League and Gainsborough Trinity from the Midland League replaced Burslem Port Vale and Crewe Alexandra. In 1897 Luton Town from the United League replaced Burton Wanderers.

Automatic promotion and relegation for two clubs were introduced in 1898 when the previous system of test matches between the bottom two clubs of the First Division and the top two clubs of the Second Division was brought into disrepute when Stoke and Burnley colluded in the final match to ensure they were both in the First Division the next season. At this point both divisions of the League expanded to eighteen, with the addition of Barnsley from the Midland and Yorkshire Leagues, Burslem Port Vale, Glossop from the Midland League, and New Brighton Tower from the Lancashire League to the Second Division.

Early 20th century
After a few years, other northern clubs began to catch up, with the likes of Newcastle United and Manchester United having success. From 1900, Aston Villa (1899–1900, 1909–10), Liverpool (1900–01, 1905–06), Sunderland (1901–02, 1912–13), The Wednesday (1902–03, 1903–04), Newcastle United (1904–05, 1908–09), Manchester United (1907–08, 1910–11) and Blackburn Rovers (1911–12, 1913–14) all won two titles prior to the outbreak of the First World War, while Everton added a second title to their much earlier success in the last season, 1914–15.

It was not until the early years of the 20th century, and the expansion of both Leagues to 20 clubs (in 1905), that further southern clubs such as Chelsea and Clapton Orient (later Leyton Orient) (1905), Fulham (1907) and Tottenham Hotspur (1908) established themselves in the League. There would be a further wait until 1931 before a southern club, Arsenal would win the League for the first time.

Unlike in most other Leagues in Europe, no single English club managed to remain ever-present in the division during the 104 years of its existence as the top division in the country. Everton comes closest, missing just four seasons through relegation, and remains one of only three clubs in England to have played over 100 top-flight seasons, along with Aston Villa and Arsenal. Arsenal are also the longest serving member of the top division, present since 1919.

Post-First World War
The League was suspended for four seasons during the First World War and resumed in 1919 with the First and Second Divisions expanded to 22 clubs. On resumption West Bromwich Albion (1919–20) and Burnley (1920–21), both original twelve clubs, won their first-ever titles (in Albion's case their only title to date).

In 1920, leading clubs from the Southern League joined the League to form a new Third Division, which in 1921 was renamed the Third Division South upon the further addition of more clubs in a new Third Division North. One club from each of these divisions would gain promotion to the Second Division, with the two relegated clubs being assigned to the more appropriate Third Division. To accommodate potential difficulties in this arrangement, clubs in the Midlands such as Mansfield Town or Walsall would sometimes be moved from one-Third Division to the other.

Following this burst of post-war growth, the League entered a prolonged period of relative stability with few changes in the membership, although there were changes on the pitch. In 1925, a new offside law reduced the number of defending opponents between the attacking player and the goal from three to two, leading to a large increase in goals, and numbers on shirts were introduced in 1939.

Between 1923 and 1926, Huddersfield Town were the first team to win three consecutive league titles (and never won another one, though they finished as runners-up for the following two years). This was equalled by Arsenal between 1932 and 1935, during a period from 1930 to 1938 in which they won five titles out of eight.

Manchester City (1936–37) became the only other club to be added to the list of Football League winners prior to the outbreak of the Second World War, the fourteenth club to achieve the feat since 1888–89.

In the 1938–39 season Everton won the title for the fifth time but suffered the same fate as in 1915, being champions when football was suspended due to the World War.

Post-Second World War
The League was suspended once more in 1939 with the outbreak of the Second World War, this time for seven seasons. The Third Divisions were expanded to 24 clubs each in 1950, bringing the total number of League clubs to 92, and in 1958 the decision was made to end the regionalisation of the Third Divisions and reorganise the clubs into a new nationwide Third Division and Fourth Division. To accomplish this, the clubs in the top half of both the Third Division North and South joined together to form the new Third Division, and those in the bottom half made up the Fourth Division. An earlier suggestion that the Third Division South should become the Third Division and the Third Division North become the Fourth Division on the basis of better attendances and that they tended to fare better when promoted was rejected. Four clubs were promoted and relegated between these two lower divisions, while two clubs exchanged places in the upper divisions until 1974 when the number increased to three.

Clubs to win their first League titles in the quarter-century following the Second World War were Portsmouth (1948–49 and 1949–50), Tottenham Hotspur (1950–51 and 1960–61), founder members of the League Wolverhampton Wanderers (1953–54, 1957–58 and 1958–59), Chelsea (1954–55), Ipswich Town (1961–62) and Leeds United (1968–69).

Tottenham Hotspur became the first club in the 20th century to win the League and FA Cup "double" in 1960–61, a season after Wolverhampton Wanderers had come within a whisker of achieving the feat themselves (Wolves won the 1959–60 FA Cup and were runners-up to Burnley in the League by a single point).

Post-Second World War changes in league football included the use of white balls in 1951 and the first floodlight game (played between Portsmouth and Newcastle United) in 1956, opening up the possibility of midweek evening matches.

By far the biggest change for league clubs during this era was a new cup competition open to all the members of the League, the Football League Cup. The League Cup was held for the first time in 1960–61 to provide clubs with a new source of income with Aston Villa winning that inaugural year. Despite an initial lack of enthusiasm on the part of some other big clubs, the competition became firmly established in the footballing calendar. It was not until the dawn of the 1970s, though, that all 92 Football League clubs regularly participated in the competition season after season.

Substitutes (one per team per match) were first allowed for injured players in 1965 and for any reason the following year.

1970s

The first ever League game to be held on a Sunday took place on 20 January 1974 (11:30 kick-off) and was played between Second Division rivals Millwall and Fulham at The Den. Millwall won 1–0. The first ever Sunday top-flight game was between Chelsea and Stoke a week later.

Beginning with the 1976–77 season, the club's finishing level on points began to be separated according to goal difference (the difference between goals scored and goals conceded) rather than goal average (goals scored divided by goals conceded). This was an effort to prevent unduly defensive play encouraged by the greater advantage in limiting goals allowed. In the event that clubs had equal points and equal goal differences, priority was given to the club that had scored the most goals. There has been only one season, 1988–89, when this level of differentiation was necessary to determine the League champion, and this was the occasion of one of the most dramatic nights in League history, when Arsenal beat Liverpool 2–0 at Anfield in the last game of the season to win the League on this tiebreaker – by a single Michael Thomas goal in the final minute of the final game of the season. Both teams would finish with the same amount of goal difference, but Arsenal had scored more goals during the season.

Two clubs won their first League titles during the 1970s: founder members of the League Derby County (1971–72 and 1974–75) and Nottingham Forest (1977–78), both clubs managed by Brian Clough and Peter Taylor. Nottingham Forest's title in 1977–78 turned out to be the last occasion that a first-time champion won the First Division title during The Football League era, before the First Division clubs formed the Premier League in 1992. The next first-time League champion club would be Leicester City in the 2015–16 season, the first such during the Premier League era.

1980s
Another important change was made in 1981, when it was decided to award three points for a win instead of two, a further effort to increase attacking football. (This scoring rule was not added by FIFA to the World Cups until the 1994 cup after the perceived dominance of defensive play at Italia 90).

The early 1980s also saw a significant decline in league attendances as a result of the recession and the ongoing problem of hooliganism. This did no favours for the financial position and league standing of numerous clubs, and several – including Wolverhampton Wanderers, Swansea City and Middlesbrough – were almost forced out of business as a result. The fortunes of the First Division clubs suffered a fresh blow in 1985 when all English clubs were banned from European competitions as a result of the Heysel disaster, where crowd trouble involving Liverpool fans at the European Cup final in Belgium resulted in 39 spectator deaths during a crush in a Juventus fan section. The loss of life occurred when a surge in the crowd (moving away from clashes between rival supporters) caused a wall to collapse. Inadequate segregation, stewarding and policing as well the generally poor condition of the ageing stadium were attributed as contributory factors.

In a similar vein, playoffs to determine promotion places were introduced for the 1986–87 season so that more clubs remained eligible for promotion closer to the end of the season, and at the same time to aid in the reduction over two years of the number of clubs in the First Division from 22 to 20. For the first two seasons, the playoffs were contested between the lowest placed team to avoid automatic relegation and three highest-placed teams to miss out on automatic promotion in the division below before it was altered from the 1988–89 season to include just the four clubs who had missed out on automatic promotion in the Second, Third and Fourth Divisions. 1986–87 was the first season of the decade where Football League attendances increased, helped by improved economic conditions and falling unemployment nationally.

At the same time, automatic promotion and relegation between the Fourth Division and the Football Conference were introduced for one club, replacing the annual application for re-election to the League of the bottom four clubs and linking the League to the developing National League System pyramid.

Emblematic of the confusion that was beginning to envelop the game, the number of clubs at the top of the league would return to 22 for the 1991–92 season, which increased competitiveness in the 1990–91 season as four teams would be promoted from the Second and Third Divisions instead of the normal three (with the seventh-place being the minimum position for the playoffs), while in the Fourth Division an unprecedented five promotion places were up for grabs, with the eighth-place being high enough for the playoffs. The end of the ban on English clubs in Europe also helped boost interest in English football. However, the economy was now in another recession and added to that the clubs in the top two English divisions were faced with the requirement of having all-seater stadiums by 1994–95 to comply with the Taylor Report that followed the death of 97 Liverpool fans as a result of the Hillsborough disaster in April 1989.

The League also expanded to 93 clubs for the 1991–92 season and planned to raise the number again to 94 clubs for 1992–93, but after Aldershot and Maidstone United both went out of business within a few months of each other in mid-1992, this plan was abandoned. The issues creating the uncertainty in the game all centered on money.

The increasing influence of money in English football was evident with such events as the first £1m transfer in the game, that of Trevor Francis from Birmingham City to Nottingham Forest in February 1979. The first £2million player transferred between English clubs was Tony Cottee, who moved from West Ham United to Everton in July 1988 – although several players had already been sold by English clubs to foreign clubs for even higher fees.

Before the formation of the FA Premier League, the highest transfer fee paid was £2.9million for the transfer of Dean Saunders from Derby County to Liverpool during the 1991 close season. The first £3million player was Alan Shearer, who moved from Southampton to Blackburn Rovers in July 1992, the summer before the first Premier League season. At the close of the 1991 season, a proposal for the establishment of a new league was tabled that would bring more money into the game overall. The Founder Members Agreement, signed on 17 July 1991 by the game's top-flight clubs, established the basic principles for setting up the FA Premier League. The newly formed top division would have commercial independence from the Football Association and the Football League, giving the FA Premier League license to negotiate its own broadcast and sponsorship agreements. The argument given at the time was that the extra income would allow English clubs to compete with teams across Europe.

1992: Foundation of the Premier League
During the 1991–92 season, the First Division clubs resigned from the Football League en masse and on 20 February 1992, the Premier League was formed as a limited company working out of an office at the Football Association's then headquarters in Lancaster Gate. This meant a break-up of the 104-year-old Football League that had operated until then with four divisions; the Premier League would operate with a single division and the Football League with three. There was no change in competition format; the same number of teams competed in the top flight, and promotion and relegation between the Premier League and the new First Division remained on the same terms as between the old First and Second Divisions.

The 1991–92 season had ended with 92 clubs in the Football League, with the 93rd club, Aldershot, having been declared bankrupt and forced to resign from the Fourth Division a few weeks before the end of the season. Colchester United, the Football Conference champions, were promoted to the new Division Three as the 71st members of the reorganised Football League. However, this number would soon drop to 70 due to the closure of Maidstone United at the beginning of the 1992–93 season, and the Football League abandoned its expansion plan. This meant that there would once again be 92 clubs in the highest four divisions of English football.

1992–2004: Three divisions
There were few major changes to the structure Football League in the 12 seasons which followed the breakaway that created the FA Premier League, perhaps the only notable changes being an expansion to 72 clubs from 70 for the 1995–96 season after the Premier League was streamlined to 20 clubs from 22, and the introduction of a second relegation place to the Football Conference from the end of the 2002–03 season.

However, following the formation of the Premier League, it became increasingly difficult for newly promoted clubs to establish themselves in the top flight. Whereas newly promoted teams had once normally survived for at least a few seasons in the old First Division, it was now the norm for at least one newly promoted club to be relegated straight back from the Premier League to Division One. In the nine seasons that followed the formation of the Premier League, at least one newly promoted club suffered this fate – and in the 1997–98 season, it happened to all three newly promoted teams. There were exceptions, however; including Blackburn Rovers, who were promoted to the Premier League on its formation and were champions three years later, and Newcastle United, who were promoted in 1993 and finished in the top six for the next four seasons, finishing Premier League runners-up twice.

The trend of relegated clubs to win an instant promotion back to the top flight continued, however. In the 12 seasons following the formation of the Premier League, there were just three seasons where none of the newly relegated sides failed to win an instant return to the Premier League.

The widening gulf between the top two divisions of English football can largely be put down to the increased wealth of the Premier League clubs, and the wealth gained by these clubs – combined with parachute payments following relegation – has also made it easier for many of them to quickly win promotion back to the top flight.

In spite of the economic prosperity between 1992 and 2004, many Football League clubs did run into financial problems during this time, although none of them were forced out of business. These include Oxford United, Luton Town, Sheffield Wednesday, Nottingham Forest, Portsmouth, Bradford City and Leicester City. Some of these clubs were faced with financial problems as a result of the lost revenue resulting from Premier League relegation and a failure to return to this level, as well as the collapse of ITV Digital in 2002.

Just after the end of the 2001–02 season, South London based Wimbledon were given permission to move to Milton Keynes, some 70 miles from their traditional home. A relocation on this scale was unprecedented in English football and led to the majority of the club's fans switching their support to a new fan-formed club, AFC Wimbledon, who joined the Combined Counties League. The club's move to Milton Keynes was completed in September 2003, when they became tenants of the National Hockey Stadium until a new permanent home was completed four years later, and the club's name changed to Milton Keynes Dons in June 2004.

2004 Football League rebranding
2004–05 was the first season to feature the rebranded Football League. The First Division, Second Division and Third Division were renamed the Football League Championship, Football League One, and Football League Two respectively. Coca-Cola replaced the Nationwide Building Society as title sponsor.

The Football League's collection of historic materials is held by the National Football Museum.

2016 rebranding
On 12 November 2015, The Football League announced that it would be officially renamed the English Football League, with the abbreviation EFL to be emphasised, effective from the beginning of the 2016–17 season. The rebranding would include a new logo consisting of a circle composed of three swathes of 24 smaller circles each. The three swathes are to represent the three divisions and the 24 circles in each swathe (making a total of 72 circles) represent the 72 clubs in the league system. Each club is to be presented with its own bespoke version of the logo. Football League Chief Executive Shaun Harvey said:

2019 review of EFL financial regulations
The EFL expulsion of Bury and the threatened expulsion of Bolton Wanderers after both League One clubs became insolvent during the summer of 2019 prompted the EFL to commission an independent review of its regulations concerning the financial sustainability of member clubs.

Project Big Picture 

"Project Big Picture" was a plan announced in October 2020 to reunite the top Premier League clubs with the EFL, proposed by leading Premier League clubs Manchester United and Liverpool. The plan was criticised by the Premier League leadership and the UK government's Department for Digital, Culture, Media and Sport. The Premier League rejected the proposal a few days later.

Records

Current member clubs 
Below are listed the member clubs of the English Football League for the 2022–23 season. Since 1888 in total there have been 144 Football League members. Originally the bottom club(s) of the bottom division(s) had to apply for re-election each year, which was voted by all the other members. Walsall holds the record for the most reapplications for the Football League. Former Football League clubs include all 20 of the current members of the Premier League along with various relegated, removed or defunct clubs.

Championship
Birmingham City
Blackburn Rovers
Blackpool
Bristol City
Burnley
Cardiff City
Coventry City
Huddersfield Town
Hull City
Luton Town
Middlesbrough
Millwall
Norwich City
Preston North End
Queens Park Rangers
Reading
Rotherham United
Sheffield United
Stoke City
Sunderland
Swansea City
Watford
West Bromwich Albion
Wigan Athletic

League One
Accrington Stanley
Barnsley
Bolton Wanderers
Bristol Rovers
Burton Albion
Cambridge United
Charlton Athletic
Cheltenham Town
Derby County
Exeter City
Fleetwood Town
Forest Green Rovers
Ipswich Town
Lincoln City
Milton Keynes Dons
Morecambe
Oxford United
Peterborough United
Plymouth Argyle
Portsmouth
Port Vale
Sheffield Wednesday
Shrewsbury Town
Wycombe Wanderers

League Two
AFC Wimbledon
Barrow
Bradford City
Carlisle United
Colchester United
Crawley Town
Crewe Alexandra
Doncaster Rovers
Gillingham
Grimsby Town
Harrogate Town
Hartlepool United
Leyton Orient
Mansfield Town
Newport County
Northampton Town
Rochdale
Salford City
Stevenage
Stockport County
Sutton United
Swindon Town
Tranmere Rovers
Walsall

Past League winners

NB: League and FA Cup double winners are highlighted in bold.

1888–1892

When the Football League was first established, all 12 clubs played in just one division.

1892–1920

In 1892 the Football League absorbed 11 of the 12 clubs in the rival Football Alliance after it folded, meaning the League now had enough clubs to form another division. The existing division was renamed the First Division and the new division was named the Second Division, which comprised most of the Football Alliance's clubs.

1920–1921
In 1920 the Football League admitted the clubs from the first division of the Southern League (the Southern League continued with its remaining clubs) and Grimsby Town, who had failed to be re-elected to the Second Division the season before and been replaced by Cardiff City (of the Southern League). The clubs were placed in the new Third Division:

1921–1958
After just one season under the old format, the League expanded again. This time it admitted a number of clubs from the north of England to balance things out, as the last expansion brought mainly clubs from the south. The existing Third Division was renamed the Third Division South, and the new division was named the Third Division North. Grimsby Town transferred to the new northern division. Both divisions ran in parallel, with clubs from both Third Divisions being promoted to the national Second Division at the end of each season:

1958–1992
For the beginning of the 1958–59 season, national Third and Fourth Divisions were introduced to replace the regional Third Division North and Third Division South:

1992–2004
Following the breakaway of the 22 clubs in the First Division to form the FA Premier League, the Football League no longer included the top division in England, and the Football League champions were no longer the national champions of England. Therefore, the Second Division became the First Division, the Third Division became the Second Division and the Fourth Division became the Third Division.

2004–present
In 2004, the Football League renamed its divisions: the First Division became the Football League Championship, the Second Division became Football League One and the Third Division became Football League Two.

At the end of the 2005–06 season, Reading finished with a record 106 points, beating the previous record of 105 held by Sunderland.

Titles by club
Due to the breakaway of the Premier League in 1992, winning the Football League title no longer makes a team the top tier champions of English football.

Football League titles 
Includes Premier League titles.

Play-offs

The Football League play-offs are used as a means of determining the final promotion place from each of the league's three divisions. This is a way of keeping the possibility of promotion open for more clubs towards the end of the season.

The format was first introduced in 1987, after the decision was made to reduce the top flight from 22 to 20 clubs over the next two seasons; initially, the play-offs involved the team finishing immediately above the relegation places in a given division and the three teams who finished immediately below the promotion places in the division below – essentially one team was fighting to keep their place in the higher division while the other three teams were attempting to take it from them. In 1989, this was changed—instead of teams from different divisions playing each other, the four teams below the automatic promotion places contested the play-offs. The first season of this arrangement saw the final being contested in home and away legs. The four teams play-off in two semi-finals and a final, with the team winning the final being promoted. Originally the semi-finals and the final were all two-legged home-and-away affairs, but from 1990 onwards the final is a one-off match. It is in this format that the play-offs continue today. A proposal to have six teams rather than four competing for the final place was defeated at the league's AGM in 2003.

Play-off winners

1: Due to financial irregularities, Swindon were prevented from taking their place in the First Division, which was awarded to the losing finalists, Sunderland.

League sponsorship

Since 1983 the League has accepted lucrative sponsorships for its main competition. Below is a list of sponsors and the League's name under their sponsorship:

 A Upon the breakaway of the First Division in 1992 to form the Premier League, Barclays became a secondary sponsor in the newly formed top division, becoming the primary sponsor from 2001 until 2016. 

After the formation of the Premier League the newly slimmed-down football League (70 clubs until 1995 and 72 clubs since) renamed its divisions to reflect the changes. The old Second Division became the new First Division, the Third Division became the Second Division, and the Fourth Division became the Third Division. The financial health of its clubs had become perhaps the highest League priority due to the limited resources available. However, there were some promising signs for the future, as the League planned to announce new initiatives beginning with the 2004–05 season, coinciding with the start of a new sponsorship agreement with Coca-Cola. The first of these changes was a rebranding of the League with the renaming of the First Division as The Championship, the Second Division as League One and the Third Division as League Two. The League's cup competitions have had different sponsors. The current sponsor Sky Bet commissioned a suite of trophies for the league from silversmith Thomas Lyte.

Media rights

United Kingdom and Ireland

Live matches 

The other major source of revenue is television. The 1980s saw competition between terrestrial broadcasters for the rights to show League matches, but the arrival on the scene of satellite broadcaster British Sky Broadcasting (Sky TV), eagerly searching for attractive programming to build its customer base and willing to pay huge sums, changed the picture entirely. The League's top-tier clubs had been agitating for several years to be able to keep more of the League's revenue for themselves, threatening to break away and form their own league if necessary. In 1992 the threat was realised as the First Division clubs left to establish the FA Premier League and signed a contract for exclusive live coverage of their games with Sky TV. The FA Premier League agreed to maintain the promotion and relegation of three clubs with The Football League, but The League was now in a far weaker position – without its best clubs and without the clout to negotiate high-revenue TV deals. This problem was exacerbated with the collapse in 2002 of ITV Digital, holder of TV rights for The Football League, which cost League clubs millions of pounds in revenue.

In 2001 the league signed a £315 million deal with ITV Digital, but in March 2002 the broadcaster was put into administration by its parent companies when the league refused to accept a £130 million reduction in the deal. As a result, ITV Digital's parent companies Granada and Carlton both cut off the deal with the EFL and consequently, ITV Digital suffered the losses. In November 2007 the league announced a new domestic rights deal worth £264 million with Sky and the BBC for the three seasons from 2009 to 2012. It covers Football League, League Cup and Football League Trophy matches and the full range of media: terrestrial and pay television, broadband internet, video-on-demand and mobile services. The deal represents a 135% increase on the previous deal and works out at an average of over £1.2 million per club per season, though some clubs will receive more than others. Sky will provide the majority of the coverage and the BBC broadcast 10 exclusively live matches from the Championship per season and the semi-finals and finals of the League Cup.
In 2012, Sky Sports signed a new exclusive deal to broadcast all matches after the BBC pulled out of the deal owing the financial cuts that the BBC Sport department was going through. However the BBC signed a new deal to still broadcast The Football League Show highlights programme.

In May 2017, it was announced that Talksport had secured exclusive national radio rights to the English Football League. It gave them the ability to broadcast up to up 110 EFL fixtures a season. Many Football League matches are also broadcast to local audiences via BBC Local Radio stations or by commercial stations.

On 18 September 2008, the Football League unveiled a new Coca-Cola Football League podcast, hosted by BBC Radio 5 Live's Mark Clemmit to be released every Thursday. In the 2012–13 season the Podcast was renamed the npower football league show but still hosted by Mark Clemmit. Mark Clemmit continued to host the show as TradePoint came on board in the 2013–14 season to be the title sponsor of the newly re-branded 'Football League Radio'. The programme is now produced by digital production studio, Engage Sports Media.

In November 2018, Sky Sports announced new controversial 5-year deal with EFL. Starting since 2019/20 season, Sky will show 138 league matches per season, with an option to increase the number of matches to 158 in the final two years of the agreement.

Highlights

International broadcasters 
 Andorra – DAZN
 Armenia – Setanta Sports
 Australia – beIN Sports
 Azerbaijan – Setanta Sports
 Belarus – Setanta Sports
 Belgium – TBA
 Bosnia and Herzegovina - Arena Sport
 Brazil – ESPN
 Bulgaria – Diema Sport and Nova Sport
 Canada – DAZN
 Caribbean – Sports Max
 Central Asia – Setanta Sports
 China – TBA
 Croatia – Arena Sport
 Cyprus – Cablenet Sports
 Czech Republic – Canal+
 Estonia – Viaplay
 France and Monaco – beIN Sports
 Georgia – Setanta Sports
 Austria, Germany, Liechtenstein and Switzerland – sportdigital.tv and DAZN
 Greece – Cosmote Sport
 Hong Kong - i-Cable
 Hungary – Arena4
 Iceland – Viaplay
 India and the subcontinent – TBA
 Indonesia - TVRI
 Israel – Charlton
 Italy – DAZN
 Japan – DAZN
 Kosovo – ArtMotion
 Latin America – ESPN
 Latvia – Viaplay
 Lithuania – Viaplay
 Luxembourg – sportdigital.tv
 Macau – TBA
 Malaysia - Mola TV
 MENA Region – beIN Sports
 Mexico – Paramount+
 Moldova – Setanta Sports
 Montenegro – Arena Sport
 New Zealand – beIN Sports 
 Nordic countries – Viasat Sport
 North Macedonia – Arena Sport
 Philippines – Setanta Sports
 Poland – Viaplay
 Portugal – TBA
 Russia – 
 Serbia – Arena Sport
 Singapore - Mola TV
 Slovakia – Canal+
 Slovenia – Arena Sport
 South Korea – Coupang
 Sub-Saharan Africa – ESPN and SuperSport 
 Spain – DAZN
 Thailand - True Sport
 Turkey – beIN Sports
 Ukraine – Setanta Sports
 United States – NBC
 Vietnam – TBA
 Streaming – Betfair and Bet365 both broadcast matches internationally. Betfair notes that the territories to which they are able to stream events varies from sport to sport. Bet365 notes that some events are not permitted to stream within the host country.

Governance and management

Board
The Football League Board meets monthly and consists of two independent directors, three directors representing the Championship, two representing League One, and one representing League Two. Current members are:

 Rick Parry - Chairman
 Trevor Birch – Chief Executive
 Debbie Jevans CBE – Independent non-executive Director
 Simon Bazalgette - Independent non-executive Director
 Richard Bowker CBE – Independent Director
 Paul Barber
 Keith Lamb 
 Jez Moxey
 Andy Ambler
 Jim Rodwell

Senior management
Andy Williamson OBE – Chief Operating Officer

Former presidents

William McGregor 1892–1894
John Bentley 1894–1910
John McKenna 1910–1936
Charles Sutcliffe 1936–1939
Will Cuff 1939–1949
Arthur Drewry 1949–1953
Arthur Oakley 1955–1957
Joseph Richards 1957–1966
Terry Shipman 1966–1974
William Westwood 1974–1981
Jack Dunnett 1981–1986
Philip Carter 1986–1988
Bill Fox 1988–1991

Arms

See also
 Football DataCo
 Football League 100 Legends
 Football League Awards
 List of English football championship winning managers
 List of English Football League managers by date of appointment
 List of Football League Cup broadcasters
 List of sports attendance figures
 Premier League–Football League gulf

Notes

References

External links

 
 RSSSF Football League archive, 1888–

 
2
Sports leagues established in 1888
1888 establishments in England
Professional sports leagues in the United Kingdom